Anthony Ohikhuaeme "Ohi" Omoijuanfo (born 10 January 1994) is a Norwegian professional footballer who plays as a forward for Danish Superliga side Brøndby IF.

Club career

Lillestrøm
On the last day of the 2010 season, Omoijuanfo became the youngest ever goalscorer in the Norwegian top division, at 16 years and 300 days. His record was broken by Håkon Lorentzen of Brann in 2013.
On 16 March 2011, Omoijuanfo signed a professional contract with Lillestrøm which would end after the 2013 season. On 23 May 2013, it was announced that Omoijuanfo had agreed to a new contract that would keep him at Lillestrøm till the end of the 2015 season.

Jerv
On 5 March 2015, Omoijuanfo joined Jerv on a free transfer and agreed to a contract that lasted till the end of the 2015 season.

Stabæk
On 4 November 2015, Omoijuanfo signed a three-year contract with Stabæk Fotball, to commence on 1 January 2016. He made his Stabæk debut on 11 March 2016 in an Eliteserien game Stabæk lost 1–0 away against Aalesund. Omoijuanfo scored his first goal for Stabæk on 3 April 2016 in a game Stabæk lost 3–1 away against Bodø/Glimt.

Molde
On 21 March 2019, Omoijuanfo joined Molde FK for a reported fee of between NOK 9 million and NOK 12 million. He signed a three-year deal with the club. Omoijuanfo made his Molde debut on 31 March 2019 in a 1–1 away draw against Sarpsborg 08. On 7 April 2019, he scored his first goal for the club in his home debut in Molde's 3–0 win against his former club Stabæk. On 10 April 2019, Omoijuanfo scored Molde's first goal in the club's 4–1 win against Vålerenga, his second goal in two home games at Aker Stadion. He scored a brace at Haugesund Stadion on 5 May 2019 in Molde's 2–1 win against Haugesund. Omoijuanfo scored his third Eliteserien hat-trick, his first for Molde, in his team's 5–1 win against Viking on 20 May 2019. On 11 July 2019, he scored Molde's seventh goal in the club's UEFA competitions record 7–1 win over KR in the UEFA Europa League first qualifying round. On the 2019 Norwegian football awards Fotballfesten, Omoijuanfo was honoured as a role model through receiving Årets spillerforbilde (Role Model Player of the Year).  Omoijuanfo finished his first season at Molde with 17 goals in 35 matches in all competitions.

Red Star
On 3 July 2021, Red Star announced  the transfer of Omoijuanfo to Belgrade and the signing of a three-year contract, which will become active on 1 January 2022. Omoijuanfo will join Red Star upon the expiration of its contract with Molde as a free agent, without compensation.

Brøndby
After weeks of rumors, it was confirmed on 30 August 2022, that Omoijuanfo had joined Danish Superliga side Brøndby IF on a deal until June 2025. He made his debut for the club on 4 September in the Superliga match against AC Horsens, heading in his side's first goal assisted by Daniel Wass in a 2–0 away win.

International career
Omoijuanfo played a total of 46 games and scored 14 goals for Norway at international youth level. 

After a good run of form with Stabæk and scoring nine goals in the first ten games of the 2017 Eliteserien, on 30 May 2017 Omoijuanfo was named by manager Lars Lagerbäck in the Norway senior team squad to face Czech Republic and Sweden in international friendlies. He made his international debut on 13 June 2017 at Ullevaal Stadion, replacing Alexander Søderlund in the second half against Sweden.

Personal life
Ohi Omoijuanfo's father is Nigerian and his mother is Norwegian. He is Christian and often celebrates goals by revealing t-shirts from under his kit with texts about Jesus.

Career statistics

Club

International

Scores and results list Norway's goal tally first, score column indicates score after each Elyounoussi goal.

Honours
Molde
Eliteserien: 2019

Red Star Belgrade
 Serbian SuperLiga: 2021–22
 Serbian Cup: 2021–22

Individual
Eliteserien Top goalscorer: 2021

References

1994 births
Living people
Norwegian footballers
Norwegian expatriate footballers
Footballers from Oslo
Norwegian people of Nigerian descent
Sportspeople of Nigerian descent
Association football forwards
Norway youth international footballers
Norway under-21 international footballers
Norway international footballers
Norwegian Christians
Holmlia SK players
Lillestrøm SK players
FK Jerv players
Stabæk Fotball players
Molde FK players
Red Star Belgrade footballers
Brøndby IF players
Eliteserien players
Serbian SuperLiga players
Norwegian First Division players
Norwegian expatriate sportspeople in Serbia
Norwegian expatriate sportspeople in Denmark
Expatriate footballers in Serbia
Expatriate men's footballers in Denmark